Diddy – Dirty Money was a musical duo consisting of singer-songwriters and dancers Dawn Richard and Kalenna Harper in 2009; both artists having been signed to Bad Boy Entertainment. Together with record producer, rapper and label boss Sean Combs, they performed as a collaborative act on the Bad Boy label, releasing the highly acclaimed and successful album Last Train to Paris in December 2010. The group disbanded in 2012.

History
According to Combs, Diddy-Dirty Money was "a look, a sound, a movement, [and] a crew" and not about "drug money, illegal money, or anything negative ... for my new concept album Last Train to Paris, I wanted to do something refreshing, something unique, something forward for myself as an artist ... I wanted to tell a love story [but] I couldn't just tell the male's point of view." Bad Boy A&R Daniel 'Skid' Mitchell told HitQuarters that Diddy-Dirty Money is creating a new genre of "futuristic soul".

The group's first album, Last Train to Paris was released in December 2010.  Allmusic called it a "heavily European-influenced effort" that "mashes together Italo disco, pop-rap, tech-house, and the sound of Bad Boy in its prime, with an all-star guest list that goes from T.I. to Grace Jones."

On July 24, 2010, Diddy-Dirty Money performed at Sun Life Stadium in the Baker Concrete Super Saturday postgame concert following the Florida Marlins' 10–5 loss to the Atlanta Braves.

Diddy-Dirty Money appeared on NBC's Saturday Night Live on December 4, 2010.

In December 2010, Diddy-Dirty Money was featured in Timati's new song and video "I'm on You".

Diddy-Dirty Money also performed "Coming Home" and "I'll Be Missing You" for the American Armed Forces at Fort Hood, Texas for WWE's Tribute to the Troops December 18, 2010.

Diddy-Dirty Money performed "Coming Home" and a cover of Far East Movement's "Like a G6" at the Maida Vale Studios for BBC Radio 1's Live Lounge on January 20, 2011.

Diddy-Dirty Money performed "Coming Home" live on American Idol with Skylar Grey on March 10, 2011.

Discography

Albums

Studio albums

Mixtapes

Singles

As lead artist

As a featured artist

Promotional singles

Other charted songs

Awards and nominations
MUZ-TV Music Awards

Best Video = "I'm on You" featuring Timati – 2011 – Won

BET Awards 2011
Best Group – Won

References

External links
Dirty Money at MTV

American hip hop groups
Musical groups disestablished in 2012
Musical groups from New York City
American contemporary R&B musical groups
Musical groups established in 2009
Bad Boy Records artists
American musical duos
American girl groups
African-American girl groups
Contemporary R&B duos
Female musical duos